Reuben Falber (14 October 1914 – 29 April 2006) was an official of the Communist Party of Great Britain. He held the post of Assistant General Secretary from 1968 to 1979.

Biography
Falber was married to Helen Goldman during the 1940s.

Following the dissolution of the Soviet Union, Falber alleged that from 1957 to 1979, he had helped fund the party by collecting suitcases of money from the Soviet Embassy. He died in 2006.

References

2006 deaths
1914 births
Communist Party of Great Britain members